Palpita spinosa is a moth in the family Crambidae. It is found in Fiji.

References

Moths described in 2008
Palpita
Moths of Fiji